This article provides details of international football games played by the Hungary national football team from 1990 to 1999.

Results

1990

1991

1992

1993

1994

1995

1996

1997

1998

1999

References 

Football in Hungary
Hungary national football team results
1990s in Hungarian sport